Mound City, also known as Houston's Mound, is an unincorporated community in Houston and Anderson counties in the U.S. state of Texas. The Anderson County portion of the community located within the Palestine, Texas micropolitan area.

History
Houston's Mound, as it was known then, was founded in the 1840s and named after an area where the terrain was higher than average. It was a thriving town until World War II; in 1930, Mound City had a general store, church, and a few houses. During the war, many residents were drafted or had to find work in larger cities. The city declined in population. There have been no population estimates since the 1960s when it was reported that a few houses remained.

Geography

Education
Mound City was never large enough to provide quality education to the pupils, so the students attended school in nearby Percilla. It later consolidated their school to Grapeland Independent School District.  Students who live on the Anderson County side of Mound City are within the Slocum Independent School District, so it is presumed that when Percilla consolidated their school, they gave their Anderson County portion to Slocum.

References

1840s establishments in Texas
Populated places established in the 1840s
Unincorporated communities in Anderson County, Texas
Unincorporated communities in Houston County, Texas
Unincorporated communities in Texas